Nanotech can refer to:

 Nanotechnology, manipulation of matter on an atomic, molecular, and supramolecular scale
 Nanotech (anthology), a 1998 anthology of science fiction short stories 
 Nanotech Energy which became Fisker Nanotech
 LiftPort Nanotech, part of LiftPort Group